Jonathan Martin may refer to:

Jonathan Martin (arsonist) (1782–1838), English arsonist
Jonathan Martín (footballer) (born 1981), Spanish footballer
Jonathan Martin (American football) (born 1989), American football offensive tackle
Jonathan Martin (journalist) (born c. 1977), American journalist
Jonathan Martin (Florida politician), member of the Florida Senate

See also
Jon Martin (born 1983), Italian DJ
John Martin (disambiguation)